This article displays the qualifying draw of the 2011 PTT Thailand Open.

Players

Seeds

Qualifiers

Qualifying draw

First qualifier

Second qualifier

Third qualifier

Fourth qualifier

References
 Qualifying Draw

Singles Qualifying 
PTT Thailand Open - Singles Qualifying 
 in Thai tennis